Raymond Rowe (9 December 1913 – 14 May 1995) was an Australian cricketer. He played ten first-class matches for New South Wales between 1932/33 and 1933/34.

See also
 List of New South Wales representative cricketers

References

External links
 

1913 births
1995 deaths
Australian cricketers
New South Wales cricketers
Cricketers from Sydney